Glenzier  (see yogh for the unintuitive spelling) is a rural area in Dumfries and Galloway, Scotland.

See also
Scots dike and the Glenzier burn.

References

Villages in Dumfries and Galloway